Kelisiun (also Romanized as Kelīsīūn; also known as Kalīseyān, Kelīsīān, Kelīsyūm, Kelīsyūn, Kelsīān, and Qal‘eh Siūn) is a village in Ahmadabad Rural District, in the Central District of Firuzabad County, Fars Province, Iran. At the 2006 census, its population was 224, in 49 families.

References 

Populated places in Firuzabad County